Kinin may refer to

 Kinin (protein)
 Kinin–kallikrein system, a hormonal system
 Kinin Corporation, the world's largest wasabi producer, which promotes 6-(Methylsulfinyl)hexyl isothiocyanate as being healthy for hair regrowth